Askaukalis (Greek ἀσκαυκαλίς, Latin Ascaucalis) was a place in Central Europe mentioned by Ptolemy in Geography (Γεωγραφικὴ Ὑφήγησις) and was one of 94 located on Magna Germania. The fourth map of Europe (Γερμανίας Μεγάλης θέσις, Εὐρώπης πίναξ δ´) was identified with today's Nakło on the Noteć, Bydgoszcz or the Crumbling Castle.

History 

Askaukalis was one of the settlements in the Gothic (Gothic-Gepid) state, known in Polish archeology as Wielbark culture. This country was founded on the territory of today's Poland in the first century CE by East Germanic tribes.

About 150 A.D. A Greek mathematician and astronomer, Ptolemy, who lived in Alexandria placed her on Magna Germania, the fourth map of Europe (Γερμανίας Μεγάλης θέσις, Εὐρώπης πίναξ δ´,) one of the 26 maps included in the famous Geography (Γεωγραφικὴ Ὑφήγησις.) The ancient researcher himself did not participate in the cartographic measurements that was needed to create them. He owed most of the information to merchants traversing the lands that he was interested in and to military cartographers of the Roman Empire.

Research 
Ptolemy, understandably, did not avoid errors resulting mainly from the need to transfer spherical reality to the map plane. He assumed that the countries between the Baltic Sea and the Danube were much narrower, which meant that places from such a distant past were extremely difficult to identify on modern maps. What's more, he was wrong in pointing out the location not only of places difficult to locate but also of such characteristic locations as, for example, Jutland or Schleswig-Holstein.

At the Institute of Geodesy and Geoinformation at the Technical University of Berlin, a group of scientists consisting of classical philologists, mathematicians and cartographers made an attempt to correct these errors and developed the so-called "Geodetic deformation analysis." On its basis, a list of cities (poleis) from Magna Germania was created with their assumed locations in today's Germany and Poland. According to Berlin scientists, these locations also correspond to archaeological sites in which Gothic settlements and burial sites were previously discovered. Also research in Bydgoszcz confirmed that in that period, due to its convenient location and easy crossing through the Brda, there was a significant development of settlements related to lively trade contacts with the Roman Empire through the Amber Road. Askaukalis was included in the so-called group 3, in which the settlements were located. Furthermore, settlements in this group were in the place of today's cities. However, as a result of mass migrations in the late antiquity they are not their direct precursors due to the lack of settlement continuity.

See also 

The History of Bydgoszcz until 1346
Aleksandra Cofta-Broniewska

Bibliography

Documents

Referenced works

References

Geographic history of Poland
Prehistoric Poland